Neuron navigator 2 is a protein that in humans is encoded by the NAV2 gene. The vitamin A metabolite, all-trans retinoic acid (atRA), plays an important role in neuronal development, including neurite outgrowth. NAV2 is an atRA-responsive gene.

The neuron navigator, Is also theorized to play a role in cellular growth and migration. In addition, different isoform variants have been discovered for this gene. Connections have been drawn to Nav2 having an association with human neurocognitive disorders Alzheimer's disease and age-related phenotypes. It has been discussed that future studies of Nav2 could provide crucial information in understanding the pathophysiology of the disease and its related phenotypes.

NAV2 association 
The NAV2 gene, which is extensively expressed in the brain and  is important to nervous system development, may play a role in Alzheimer's disease. Alzheimer's disease is a chronic neurological illness whose prevalence rises rapidly as people reach the age of 65. According to reports, Alzheimer's disease is one of the top ten main causes of death in the United States.There are 50 introns and 38 exons in the neuron navigator 2 (NAV2) gene. The NAV2 gene was shown to be strongly expressed in the brain, as well as the kidney, liver, thyroid, mammary gland, and spinal cord (and may be involved in cell proliferation, migration, and nervous system development). NAV2 has recently been linked to episodic memory scores in Alzheimer's patients.To date, no study has looked into the link between the NAV2 gene and the risk or AAO of Alzheimer's disease. NAV2 may be one of the processes linking blood pressure, cardiovascular disease, and neurodegenerative disorders, according to this study. NAV2 was found to be overexpressed in human colorectal cancer in another gene expression analysis, suggesting that it could be used as a predictive biomarker as well as a possible therapeutic target for colorectal cancer. However, the conducted study may have some limitations, so more research is needed to adequately understand the purpose of NAV2.

References 

Wang, Ke-Sheng; Liu, Ying; Xu, Chun; Liu, Xuefeng; Luo, Xingguang (2017-09-15). "Family-based association analysis of NAV2 gene with the risk and age at onset of Alzheimer's disease". Journal of Neuroimmunology. 310: 60–65. doi:10.1016/j.jneuroim.2017.06.010. ISSN 1872-8421. PMC 6167010. PMID 28778446.

Wang, Ke-Sheng; Liu, Ying; Xu, Chun; Liu, Xuefeng; Luo, Xingguang (2017-09-15). "Family-based association analysis of NAV2 gene with the risk and age at onset of Alzheimer's disease". Journal of Neuroimmunology. 310: 60–65. doi:10.1016/j.jneuroim.2017.06.010. ISSN 1872-8421. PMC 6167010. PMID 28778446.

Further reading

Human proteins